The Greenwich Township School District is a community public school district that serves students in kindergarten through eighth grade from Greenwich Township, Gloucester County, New Jersey, United States.

As of the 2018–19 school year, the district, comprising two schools, had an enrollment of 408 students and 46.0 classroom teachers (on an FTE basis), for a student–teacher ratio of 8.9:1.

The district is classified by the New Jersey Department of Education as being in District Factor Group "DE", the fifth-highest of eight groupings. District Factor Groups organize districts statewide to allow comparison by common socioeconomic characteristics of the local districts. From lowest socioeconomic status to highest, the categories are A, B, CD, DE, FG, GH, I and J.

Public school students in ninth through twelfth grades attend Paulsboro High School in Paulsboro as part of a sending/receiving relationship with the Paulsboro Public Schools. As of the 2018–19 school year, the high school had an enrollment of 322 students and 31.1 classroom teachers (on an FTE basis), for a student–teacher ratio of 10.4:1.

Schools
Schools in the district (with 2018–19 enrollment data from the National Center for Education Statistics) are:
Elementary school
Broad Street Elementary School with 273 students in grades K-4
Alisa Whitcraft, Principal
Middle school
Nehaunsey Middle School with 132 students in grades 5-8
Dr. Jennifer M. Foley-Hindman, Principal

Administration
Core members of the district's administration are:
Dr. Jennifer M. Foley-Hindman, Superintendent
Scott A. Campbell, Business Administrator / Board Secretary

Board of education
The district's board of education, with seven members, sets policy and oversees the fiscal and educational operation of the district through its administration. As a Type II school district, the board's trustees are elected directly by voters to serve three-year terms of office on a staggered basis, with either two or three seats up for election each year held (since 2013) as part of the November general election.

References

External links
Greenwich Township School District

School Data for the Greenwich Township School District, National Center for Education Statistics
Paulsboro High School

Greenwich Township, Gloucester County, New Jersey
New Jersey District Factor Group DE
School districts in Gloucester County, New Jersey